The 1952 Scottish League Cup final was played on 25 October 1952, at Hampden Park in Glasgow and was the final of the 7th Scottish League Cup competition. The final was contested by Dundee and Kilmarnock. Dundee won the match 2–0, thanks to two goals by Bobby Flavell. This meant that they retained the trophy, having beaten Rangers in the previous season.

Match details

External links
 Soccerbase

1952
League Cup Final
Dundee F.C. matches
Kilmarnock F.C. matches
1950s in Glasgow
October 1952 sports events in the United Kingdom